Noah Skaalum Jørgensen (born Sarah Skaalum Jørgensen; 6 July 1995) is a Danish singer who won the fourth season of the Danish version of The X Factor on 25 March 2011 at the age of 15. Assigned female at birth, Skaalum publicly came out as a trans man in 2018.

Biography 
Skaalum started singing at a young age, appearing in musicals and joining a musical band at the age of 12. At the age of 15, Skaalum won the fourth season of the Danish version of The X Factor, defeating Babou Lowe and Annelouise Sørensen in the final on 25 March 2011.

Personal life 
On 12 December 2014, at the age of 19, Skaalum married girlfriend Sika Katrine Andersen. In 2018, Skaalum publicly came out as a trans man, announcing his new name as Noah. He and his wife have a son, born 26 November 2019. In 2020, he starred in a documentary about his transition, Sarahs forvandling til far, which aired on TV 2.

Performances during X Factor

Discography

Albums

Singles

As lead artist
(All credited as Sarah)

Other songs
(All credited as Sarah)
2011: "Når du rør mig"
2012: "I Can't"
2012: "Tonight We're in Love"

References

1995 births
Living people
Transgender male musicians
The X Factor winners
Danish LGBT singers
21st-century Danish male singers
Danish transgender people
Transgender singers